Nandini/Nasardi is an insignificant tributary of the river Godavari which runs its course through the city of Nashik, Maharashtra.

The river begins on the northern face the eastern spurs of Anjaneri hills to south-west of Nashik. From the site of origin the river quickly courses through the Nashik draining much of its effluent waste. A survey in 2012 deemed the river as the filthiest river in Nashik District. The river drains into the Godavari at Samta Nagar.

Nashik Municipal Corporation (NMC) in 2013 approved the proposal to construct a protection wall on the left bank of the Nandini River at a cost of Rs 7.76 crore.

References 

Tributaries of the Godavari River